Merima is a female forename which has separate Habesha and Slavic origins.

Ethiopian people
Merima Denboba (born 1974), long-distance runner and cross country specialist
Merima Hashim (born 1981), long-distance runner and world junior medallist
Merima Mohammed (born 1992), long-distance runner and marathon specialist

Slavic people
Merima Kadic (born 2001), political philosopher 

Slavic feminine given names
Ethiopian given names